Miina Kallas (born 7 July 1989) is an Estonian football player who plays as a forward for Naiste Meistriliiga club Flora Tallinn. She has made a total of 31 appearances for the Estonia women's national football team, scoring one goal.

References

External links

1989 births
Living people
Estonian women's footballers
Estonia women's international footballers
Women's association football forwards
FC Flora (women) players